Tarantulas comprise a group of large and often hairy spiders of the family Theraphosidae. , 1,040 species have been identified, with 156 genera. The term "tarantula" is usually used to describe members of the family Theraphosidae, although many other members of the same infraorder (Mygalomorphae) are commonly referred to as "tarantulas" or "false tarantulas".  Some of the more common species have become popular in the exotic pet trade. Many New World species kept as pets have setae known as urticating hairs that can cause irritation to the skin, and in extreme cases, cause damage to the eyes.

Overview 
Like all arthropods, the tarantula is an invertebrate that relies on an exoskeleton for muscular support. Like other Arachnida, a tarantula's body comprises two main parts, the prosoma (or cephalothorax) and the opisthosoma (or abdomen). The prosoma and opisthosoma are connected by the pedicel, or pregenital somite. This waist-like connecting piece is actually part of the prosoma and gives the opisthosoma a wide range of motion relative to the prosoma.

Tarantula sizes can range from as small as the size of a BB pellet to as large as a dinner plate when the legs are fully extended. Leg span is determined by measuring from the tip of the back leg to the tip of the front leg on the opposite side.

Theraphosa apophysis (the pinkfoot goliath) was described 187 years after the goliath birdeater, so its characteristics are not as well attested. T. blondi is generally thought to be the heaviest tarantula, and T. apophysis has the greatest leg span. Two other species, Lasiodora parahybana (the Brazilian salmon birdeater) and Lasiodora klugi, rival the size of the two goliath spiders.

Most species of North American tarantulas are brown. Elsewhere, species have been found that variously display cobalt blue (Cyriopagopus lividus), black with white stripes (Aphonopelma seemanni), yellow leg markings (Eupalaestrus campestratus), metallic blue legs with vibrant orange abdomen and green prosoma (Chromatopelma cyaneopubescens). Their natural habitats include savanna, grassland such as in the pampas, rainforest, desert, scrubland, mountains, and cloud forest. They are generally classed among the terrestrial types. They are burrowers that live in the ground.

Tarantulas are becoming increasingly popular as pets and some species are readily available in captivity.

Identification 
Tarantulas can be confused with other members of the order Mygalomorphae, such as trapdoor spiders, funnel-web spiders and purseweb spiders. They can also be confused with some members of the order Araneomorphae such as the Lycosidae family. There are multiple ways to identify a tarantula. First the hairs: in the Americas most tarantulas have urticating hairs, though some, such as the Hemirrhagus genus, lack these. The hairs are usually more noticeable than with most other spiders. Another is the size, as tarantulas tend to be bigger, but this is again not a failproof way. They also don't use their webs for hunting, instead using them as building material or tripwire.

One of the most decisive ways to tell is by looking at their fangs. Tarantula fangs face downwards, as opposed to those of true spiders, which face each other, allowing them to make pincerlike motions. They also own two book lungs, as opposed to true spiders which only have one. Their lifespan is also longer than most spiders.

Etymology 
The spider originally bearing the name tarantula was Lycosa tarantula, a species of wolf spider native to Mediterranean Europe. The name is derived from the southern Italian town of Taranto. The term tarantula was subsequently applied to almost any large, unfamiliar species of ground-dwelling spider, in particular to the Mygalomorphae and especially the New World Theraphosidae. Compared to tarantulas, wolf spiders are not particularly large or hairy, and so among English speakers in particular, usage eventually shifted in favour of the Theraphosidae, even though they are not closely related to wolf spiders at all, being in a different infraorder.
The name tarantula is also incorrectly applied to other large-bodied spiders, including the purseweb spiders or atypical tarantulas, the funnel-webs (Dipluridae and Hexathelidae), and the dwarf tarantulas. These spiders are related to tarantulas (all being mygalomorphs) but fall into different families from them. Huntsman spiders of the family Sparassidae have also been termed tarantulas because of their large size, when, in fact, they are not related. Instead, huntsman spiders belong to the infraorder Araneomorphae.

The element pelma in genus names

Many theraphosid genera have names, either accepted or synonymous, containing the element pelma. This can be traced back to Carl Ludwig Koch in 1850, who in describing his new genus Eurypelma wrote, "". German arachnologists use the word  to refer to the tarsus (the last article of a spider's leg). Translations of  into Latin use the word . Hence in English arachnological terminology, Koch meant 'the scopula of the base of the tarsus very wide'. Thus Eurypelma literally means 'wide footsole'; however, arachnologists have conventionally taken pelma in such names to refer to the scopula, so producing the meaning 'with a wide scopula'.

Other genus names or synonyms that Estrada-Alvarez and Cameron regard as having 'footsole' or 'scopula' meanings include:
Acanthopelma – Greek  'thorn, spine'; overall meaning 'spiny footsole'
Brachypelma – Greek  'short'; overall meaning 'short scopula'
Metriopelma – Greek  'of moderate size'; overall meaning 'medium length scopula'
Schizopelma – from the Greek origin combining form schizo- 'split'; overall meaning 'split footsole'
Sericopelma – Greek  'silky'; overall meaning 'silken scopula'

Later, particularly following genus names published by R.I. Pocock in 1901, the element pelma appears to have become synonymous with 'theraphosid'. For example, the author of Cardiopelma writes, "" ('Cardiopelma refers to the female genitalia that evoke the shape of a heart'), with no reference to either 'footsole' or 'scopula'. Names interpreted in this way include:
Aphonopelma – Greek  'soundless'; overall meaning 'theraphosid without sound'
Cardiopelma –  Greek  'heart'; overall meaning 'heart theraphosid' (referring to the heart-shaped female genitalia)
Clavopelma – Latin  'club'; overall meaning 'theraphosid with club-shaped hairs'
Delopelma – Greek  'clear, obvious, visible, conspicuous, plain'; overall meaning 'theraphosid without plumose hair'
Gosipelma – the element gosi- means 'desert', relating to the Gosiute people; overall meaning 'desert theraphosid'
Spelopelma –  Greek  'cave'; overall meaning 'cave theraphosid'

Distribution 
Tarantulas of various species occur throughout the United States, Mexico, in Central America, and throughout South America. Other species occur variously throughout Africa, much of Asia (including the Ryukyu Islands in southern Japan), and all of Australia. In Europe, some species occur in Spain, Portugal, Turkey, southern Italy, and Cyprus.

Habits 
Some genera of tarantulas hunt prey primarily in trees; others hunt on or near the ground. All tarantulas can produce silk; while arboreal species typically reside in a silken "tube tent", terrestrial species line their burrows with silk to stabilize the burrow wall and facilitate climbing up and down. Tarantulas mainly eat large insects and other arthropods such as centipedes, millipedes, and other spiders, using ambush as their primary method of prey capture. Armed with their massive, powerful chelicerae tipped with long, chitinous fangs, tarantulas are well-adapted to killing other large arthropods. The biggest tarantulas sometimes kill and consume small vertebrates such as lizards, mice, bats, birds, and small snakes.

Appendages 

The eight legs, the two chelicerae with their fangs, and the pedipalps are attached to the prosoma. The chelicerae are two double-segmented appendages located just below the eyes and directly forward of the mouth. The chelicerae contain the venom glands that vent through the fangs. The fangs are hollow extensions of the chelicerae that inject venom into prey or animals that the tarantula bites in defense, and they are also used to masticate. These fangs are articulated so that they can extend downward and outward in preparation to bite or can fold back toward the chelicerae as a pocket knife blade folds back into its handle. The chelicerae of a tarantula completely contain the venom glands and the muscles that surround them, and can cause the venom to be forcefully injected into prey.

The pedipalpi are two six-segmented appendages connected to the prosoma near the mouth and protruding on either side of both chelicerae. In most species of tarantulas, the pedipalpi contain sharp, jagged plates used to cut and crush food often called the coxae or maxillae. As with other spiders, the terminal portions of the pedipalpi of males function as part of their reproductive system. Male spiders spin a silken platform (sperm web) on the ground onto which they release semen from glands in their opisthosoma. Then they insert their pedipalps into the semen, absorb the semen into the pedipalps, and later insert the pedipalps (one at a time) into the reproductive organ of the female, which is located in her abdomen. The terminal segments of the pedipalps of male tarantulas are moderately larger in circumference than those of a female tarantula. Male tarantulas have special spinnerets surrounding the genital opening. Silk for the sperm web of the tarantula is exuded from these special spinnerets.

A tarantula has four pairs of legs and two additional pairs of appendages. Each leg has seven segments, which from the prosoma out are: coxa, trochanter, femur, patella, tibia, tarsus and pretarsus, and claw. Two or three retractable claws at the end of each leg are used to grip surfaces for climbing. Also on the end of each leg, surrounding the claws, is a group of bristles, called the scopula, which help the tarantula to grip better when climbing surfaces such as glass. The fifth pair is the pedipalps, which aid in feeling, gripping prey, and mating in the case of a mature male. The sixth pair of appendages is the chelicerae and their attached fangs. When walking, a tarantula's first and third legs on one side move at the same time as the second and fourth legs on the other side of its body. The muscles in a tarantula's legs cause the legs to bend at the joints, but to extend a leg, the tarantula increases the pressure of haemolymph entering the leg.

Tarantulas, like almost all other spiders, have their primary spinnerets at the end of the opisthosoma. Unlike most spider species in the infraorder Araneomorphae, which includes the majority of extant spider species, and most of which have six, tarantula species have two or four spinnerets. Spinnerets are flexible, tube-like structures from which the spider exudes its silk. The tip of each spinneret is called the spinning field. Each spinning field is covered by as many as 100 spinning tubes through which silk is exuded. As the silk is pulled out of the spinnerets, the shear forces cause proteins in the silk to crystallize, transforming it from a liquid to a solid thread.

Digestive system 

The tarantula's mouth is located under its chelicerae on the lower front part of its prosoma. The mouth is a short, straw-shaped opening that can only suck, meaning that anything taken into it must be in liquid form. Prey with large amounts of solid parts, such as mice, must be crushed and ground up or predigested, which is accomplished by coating the prey with digestive juices secreted from openings in the chelicerae.

The tarantula's digestive organ (stomach) is a tube that runs the length of its body. In the prosoma, this tube is wider and forms the sucking stomach. When the sucking stomach's powerful muscles contract, the stomach is increased in cross-section, creating a strong sucking action that permits the tarantula to suck its liquefied prey up through the mouth and into the intestines. Once the liquefied food enters the intestines, it is broken down into particles small enough to pass through the intestine walls into the hemolymph (blood stream), where it is distributed throughout the body. After feeding, the leftovers are formed into a small ball by the tarantula and thrown away. In a terrarium, they often put them into the same corner.

Nervous system 
A tarantula's central nervous system (brain) is located in the bottom of the inner prosoma. A tarantula perceives its surroundings primarily via sensory organs called setae (bristles or spines, sometimes referred to as hairs). Although a tarantula has eight eyes like most spiders, touch is its keenest sense, and in hunting, it primarily depends on vibrations given off by the movements of its prey. A tarantula's setae are very sensitive organs and are used to sense chemical signatures, vibrations, wind direction, and possibly even sound. Tarantulas are also very responsive to the presence of certain chemicals such as pheromones.

The eyes are located above the chelicerae on the forward part of the prosoma. They are small and usually set in two rows of four. Most tarantulas are not able to see much more than light, darkness, and motion. Arboreal tarantulas generally have better vision compared with terrestrial tarantulas.

Respiratory system 
All types of tarantulas have two sets of book lungs (breathing organs); the first pair is located in a cavity inside the lower front part of the abdomen near where the abdomen connects to the cephalothorax, and the second pair is slightly farther back on the abdomen. Air enters the cavity through a tiny slit on each side of and near the front of the abdomen. Each lung consists of 15 or more thin sheets of folded tissue arranged like the pages of a book. These sheets of tissue are supplied by blood vessels. As air enters each lung, oxygen is taken into the blood stream through the blood vessels in the lungs. Needed moisture may also be absorbed from humid air by these organs.

Circulatory system 

A tarantula's blood is unique (not only in appearance); an oxygen-transporting protein is present (the copper-based hemocyanin), but not enclosed in blood cells such as the erythrocytes of mammals. A tarantula's blood is not true blood, but rather a liquid called hemolymph (or haemolymph). At least four types of hemocytes, or hemolymph cells, are known.

The tarantula's heart is a long, slender tube  located along the top of the opisthosoma. The heart is neurogenic as opposed to myogenic, so nerve cells instead of muscle cells initiate and coordinate the heart. It pumps hemolymph to all parts of the body through open passages often referred to as sinuses, and not through a circular system of blood vessels. If the exoskeleton is breached, loss of hemolymph will kill the spider unless the wound is small enough that the hemolymph can dry and close it.

Predators 
Despite their large size and fearsome appearance and reputation, tarantulas themselves are prey for many other animals. The most specialized of these predators are large members of the wasp family Pompilidae such as the wasp Hemipepsis ustulata. These wasps are called "tarantula hawks". The largest tarantula hawks, such as those in the genus Pepsis,  track, attack, and kill large tarantulas. They use olfaction to find the lair of a tarantula. The wasp must deliver a sting to the underside of the spider's cephalothorax, exploiting the thin membrane between the basal leg segments. This paralyzes the spider, and the wasp then drags it back into its burrow before depositing an egg on the prey's abdomen. The wasp then seals the spider in its burrow and flies off to search for more hosts. The wasp egg hatches into a larva and feeds on the spider's inessential parts, and as it approaches pupation, it consumes the remainder. Other arthropods, such as large scorpions and giant centipedes, are also known to prey on tarantulas.

Tarantulas are also preyed upon by a wide variety of vertebrates. Many of these, including lizards, frogs, birds, snakes and mammals, are generalist predators of all kinds of large arthropods. Mammals that have been known to prey on tarantulas, such as the coati, kinkajou, and opossum in the New World, and mongooses and the honey badger in the Old World, are often immune to the venom of their arthropod prey.

Humans also consume tarantulas for food in their native ranges. They are considered a delicacy in certain cultures (e.g. Venezuela  and Cambodia). They can be roasted over an open fire to remove the bristles (described further below) and then eaten.

Tarantulas have evolved specialized bristles, or setae, to defend themselves against predators. Besides the normal bristles covering the body, some tarantulas also have a dense covering of irritating bristles called urticating hairs, on the opisthosoma, that they sometimes use as protection against enemies. These bristles are present on most New World species, but not on any specimens from the Old World. Urticating hairs are usually kicked off the abdomen by the tarantula, but some may simply rub the abdomen against the target, like the genus Avicularia. These fine bristles are barbed and serve to irritate. They can be lethal to small animals such as rodents. Some people are sensitive to these bristles, and develop serious itching and rashes at the site. Exposure of the eyes and respiratory system to urticating hairs should be strictly avoided. Species with urticating hairs can kick these bristles off; they are flicked into the air at a target using their back pairs of legs. Tarantulas also use these bristles for other purposes, such as to mark territory or to line their shelters (the latter such practice may discourage flies from feeding on the spiderlings). Urticating hairs do not grow back, but are replaced with each molt. The intensity, number, and flotation of the bristles depends on the species of tarantula.

To predators and other enemies, these bristles can range from being lethal to simply being a deterrent. With humans, they can cause irritation to eyes, nose, and skin, and more dangerously, the lungs and airways, if inhaled. The symptoms range from species to species, from person to person, from a burning itch to a minor rash. In some cases, tarantula bristles have caused permanent damage to human eyes.

Some setae are used to stridulate, which makes a hissing sound. These bristles are usually found on the chelicerae. Stridulation seems to be more common in Old World species.

Bites and urticating bristles 

All tarantulas are venomous. Although their venom is not deadly to humans, some bites cause serious discomfort that might persist for several days. In general, the effects of the bites of all kinds of tarantula are not well known. While the bites of many species are known to be no worse than a wasp sting, accounts of bites by some species are reported to be very painful and to produce intense spasms that may recur over a period of several days; the venom of the African tarantula Pelinobius muticus also causes strong hallucinations. For Poecilotheria species, researchers have described more than 20 bites with the delayed onset of severe and diffuse muscle cramps, lasting for several days, that in most cases resolved completely with the use of benzodiazepines and magnesium. In all cases, seeking medical aid is advised.  Because other proteins are included when a toxin is injected, some individuals may suffer severe symptoms due to an allergic reaction rather than to the venom. Such allergic effects can be life-threatening. Additionally, the large fangs of a tarantula can inflict painful puncture wounds, which can lead to secondary bacterial infections if not properly treated.

Before biting, a tarantula may signal its intention to attack by rearing up into a "threat posture", which may involve raising its prosoma and lifting its front legs into the air, spreading and extending its fangs, and (in certain species) making a loud hissing by stridulating. Tarantulas often hold this position for longer than the duration of the original threat. Their next step, without biting, may be to slap down on the intruder with their raised front legs. If that response fails to deter the attacker, the tarantulas of the Americas may next turn away and flick urticating hairs toward the pursuing predator. The next response may be to leave the scene entirely, but especially if no line of retreat is available, their final response may also be to whirl suddenly and bite. Some tarantulas are well known to give "dry bites", i.e., they may defensively bite some animal that intrudes on their space and threatens them, but they do not pump venom into the wound.

New-world tarantulas—those indigenous to the Americas—have bites that generally pose little threat to humans (other than causing localized pain). Most of them are equipped with urticating hairs on their abdomens, and almost always throw these barbed bristles as the first line of defense. These bristles irritate sensitive areas of the body and especially seem to target curious animals that may sniff these bristles into the mucous membranes of the nose. Some species have more effective urticating bristles than others. The goliath birdeater is known for its particularly irritating urticating bristles. They can penetrate the cornea, so eye protection should be worn when handling such tarantulas.

Old World tarantulas  have no urticating bristles and are more likely to attack when disturbed. They often have more potent, medically significant venom, and are faster and much more nervous and defensive than New World species.

Some dangerous spider species are related to tarantulas and are frequently confused with them. A popular urban legend maintains that deadly varieties of tarantula exist somewhere in South America. This claim is often made without identifying a particular spider, although the "banana tarantula" is sometimes named. A likely candidate for the true identity of this spider is the dangerous Brazilian wandering spider (Phoneutria fera) of the family Ctenidae, as it is sometimes found hiding in clusters of bananas and is one of several spiders called "banana spiders". It is not technically a tarantula, but it is fairly large (4- to 5-inch legspan), somewhat ″hairy″, and is highly venomous to humans. Another dangerous type of spiders that have been confused with tarantulas are the Australian funnel-web spiders. The best known species of these is the Sydney funnel-web spider (Atrax robustus) a spider that is aggressive, highly venomous, and (prior to the development of antivenom in the 1980s) was responsible for numerous deaths in Australia. These spiders are members of the same infraorder as tarantulas, Mygalomorphae. Some Australians use the slang term "triantelope" (a corruption of the incorrect term tarantula, which is also used) for large, ″hairy″, and harmless members of the huntsman spider family, which are often found on interior household walls and in automobiles.

Sexual dimorphism 
Some tarantula species exhibit pronounced sexual dimorphism. Males tend to be smaller (especially their abdomens, which can appear quite narrow) and may be dull in color when compared to their female counterparts, as in the species Haplopelma lividum. Mature male tarantulas also may have tibial hooks on their front legs, which are used to restrain the female's fangs during copulation. Males typically have longer legs than the females.

A juvenile male's sex can be determined by looking at a cast exuvia for epiandrous fusillae or spermathecae. Females possess spermathecae, except for the species Sickius longibulbi and Encyocratella olivacea. Males have much shorter lifespans than females because they die relatively soon after maturing. Few live long enough for a postultimate molt, which is unlikely in natural habitats because they are vulnerable to predation, but  has happened in captivity, though rarely. Most males do not live through this molt, as they tend to get their emboli, mature male sexual organs on pedipalps, stuck in the molt. Most tarantula fanciers regard females as more desirable as pets due to their much longer lifespans. Wild-caught tarantulas are often mature males because they wander out in the open and are more likely to be caught.

Life cycle 

Like other spiders, tarantulas have to shed their exoskeleton periodically  as they grow, a process called molting. A young tarantula may do this several times a year as a part of the maturation process, while full-grown specimens only molt once a year or less, or sooner, to replace lost limbs or lost urticating hairs. It is visibly apparent that molting is imminent when the exoskeleton takes on a darker shade. If a tarantula previously used its urticating hairs, the bald patch turns from a peach color to deep blue. The tarantula also stops feeding and becomes more lethargic during this time.

While most Tarantulas species take between two to five years to reach sexual maturity, some species can take up to 10 years. Upon reaching adulthood, males typically have an 18-month period left to live so immediately go in search of a female mate. Although females continue to molt after reaching maturity, male rarely do again once they reach adulthood. Those that do often can become stuck during the molting process due to their sexual organs and die.

Female can live for 30 to 40 years. Grammostola rosea spiders, which eat once or twice a week, have lived up to 20 years in captivity.  Some have survived on water alone for up to two years.

Reproduction 

After reaching sexual maturity, a female tarantula normally mates and lays eggs once per year, although they do not always do so.

As with other spiders, the mechanics of intercourse are quite different from those of mammals. Once a male spider reaches maturity and becomes motivated to mate, he weaves a web mat on a flat surface. The spider then rubs his abdomen on the surface of this mat, and in so doing, releases a quantity of semen. He may then insert his pedipalps (short, leg-like appendages between the chelicerae and front legs) into the pool of semen. The pedipalps absorb the semen and keep it viable until a mate can be found. When a male spider detects the presence of a female, the two exchange signals to establish that they are of the same species. These signals may also lull the female into a receptive state. If the female is receptive, then the male approaches her and inserts his pedipalps into an opening in the lower surface of her abdomen, the opisthosoma. After the semen has been transferred to the receptive female's body, the male swiftly leaves the scene before the female recovers her appetite. Although females may show some aggression after mating, the male rarely becomes a meal.

Females deposit 50 to 2,000 eggs, depending on the species, in a silken egg sac and guard it for six to eight weeks. During this time, the females stay very close to the egg sacs and become more aggressive. Within most species, the females turn the egg sac often, which is called brooding. This keeps the eggs from deforming due to sitting in one position too long. The young spiderlings remain in the nest for some time after hatching, where they live off the remains of their yolk sacs before dispersing.

Taxonomy 
Linnaeus placed all spiders in a single genus, Aranea. In 1802, Charles Athanase Walckenaer separated mygalomorph spiders into a separate genus, Mygale, leaving all other spiders in Aranea. However, Mygale had already been used in 1800 by Georges Cuvier for a genus of mammals (in Greek, mygale means "shrew"). Accordingly, in 1869, Tamerlan Thorell used the family name "Theraphosoidae" (modern Theraphosidae) for the mygalomorph spiders known to him, rather than "Mygalidae" (as used, for example, by John Blackwall). Thorell later split the family into a number of genera, including Theraphosa.

Subfamilies 
A 2019 phylogenomic study recognized 12 subfamilies, one (Ischnocolinae) known not to be monophyletic.

Aviculariinae
Eumenophorinae
Harpactirinae
Ischnocolinae
Ornithoctoninae
Poecilotheriinae
Psalmopoeinae
Schismatothelinae
Selenocosmiinae
Stromatopelminae
Theraphosinae
Thrigmopoeinae

The relationship between the subfamilies found in the study is shown in the following cladogram. The dual placing of Ischnocolinae is highlighted.

All the species that possess urticating hairs and have been seen to use them in bombardment behavior are placed in the "bombardier clade", although not all species in the included subfamilies possess such hairs (all Schismatothelinae lack them as do most Psalmopoeinae genera). It is not clear whether the possession of urticating hairs was an ancestral trait of the clade, and has been lost in some species, or whether it represents multiple gains. Foley et al. suggested that the second hypothesis appeared to be better supported.

Other subfamilies that have been recognized include:
Acanthopelminae – may be treated as synonymous with Ischnocolinae
Selenogyrinae 
Spelopelminae – typically not accepted, Hemirrhagus being treated as Theraphosinae

Genera 
, the World Spider Catalog accepted the following genera:

Acanthopelma F. O. Pickard-Cambridge, 1897 – Guyana
Acanthoscurria Ausserer, 1871 – South America, Guatemala
Acentropelma Pocock, 1901 – Belize, Mexico, Guatemala
Aenigmarachne Schmidt, 2005 – Costa Rica
Agnostopelma Pérez-Miles & Weinmann, 2010 – Colombia
Aguapanela Perafán & Cifuentes, 2015
Amazonius Cifuentes & Bertani, 2022 - South America
Annandaliella Hirst, 1909 – India
Anoploscelus Pocock, 1897 – Uganda, Tanzania, Rwanda
Anqasha Sherwood & Gabriel, 2022 - Peru
Antikuna Kaderka, Ferretti, West, Lüddecke & Hüsser, 2021 - Peru
Antillena Bertani, Huff & Fukushima, 2017 – Dominican Republic
Aphonopelma Pocock, 1901 – North America, Central America
Augacephalus Gallon, 2002 – South Africa, Mozambique, Eswatini
Avicularia Lamarck, 1818 – South America, Trinidad and Tobago, Panama
Bacillochilus Gallon, 2010 – Angola
Batesiella Pocock, 1903 – Cameroon
Birupes Gabriel & Sherwood, 2019 – Malaysia
Bistriopelma Kaderka, 2015 – Peru
Bonnetina Vol, 2000 – Mexico
Brachionopus Pocock, 1897 – South Africa
Brachypelma Simon, 1891 – Mexico, Costa Rica, Guatemala
Bumba Pérez-Miles, Bonaldo & Miglio, 2014 – Brazil, Venezuela, Ecuador
Cardiopelma Vol, 1999 – Unknown
Caribena Fukushima & Bertani, 2017 – Cuba
Catanduba Yamamoto, Lucas & Brescovit, 2012 – Brazil
Catumiri Guadanucci, 2004 – South America
Ceratogyrus Pocock, 1897 – Africa
Chaetopelma Ausserer, 1871 – Asia, Greece, Africa
Chilobrachys Karsch, 1892 – Asia
Chromatopelma Schmidt, 1995 – Venezuela
Citharacanthus Pocock, 1901 – Cuba, Central America, Mexico
Citharognathus Pocock, 1895 – Indonesia
Clavopelma Chamberlin, 1940 – Mexico
Coremiocnemis Simon, 1892 – Malaysia, Indonesia, Australia
Cotztetlana Mendoza, 2012 – Mexico
Crassicrus Reichling & West, 1996 – Mexico, Belize
Cubanana Ortiz, 2008 – Cuba
Cyclosternum Ausserer, 1871 – South America, Mexico, Costa Rica
Cymbiapophysa Gabriel & Sherwood, 2020
Cyriocosmus Simon, 1903 – South America, Trinidad and Tobago
Cyriopagopus Simon, 1887 – Asia
Cyrtogrammomma"Pocock, 1895 - Guyana and BrazilCyrtopholis Simon, 1892 – CaribbeanDavus O. Pickard-Cambridge, 1892 – Central America, MexicoDolichothele Mello-Leitão, 1923 – Brazil, BoliviaDugesiella Pocock, 1901 - MexicoEncyocratella Strand, 1907 – TanzaniaEncyocrates Simon, 1892 – MadagascarEphebopus Simon, 1892 – Suriname, BrazilEuathlus Ausserer, 1875 – Chile, ArgentinaEucratoscelus Pocock, 1898 – Kenya, TanzaniaEumenophorus Pocock, 1897 – Sierra LeoneEupalaestrus Pocock, 1901 – South AmericaEuphrictus Hirst, 1908 – Cameroon, CongoEuthycaelus Simon, 1889 – Colombia, VenezuelaGrammostola Simon, 1892 – South AmericaGuyruita Guadanucci, Lucas, Indicatti & Yamamoto, 2007 – Brazil, VenezuelaHapalopus Ausserer, 1875 – South America, PanamaHapalotremus Simon, 1903 – Bolivia, Peru, ArgentinaHaploclastus Simon, 1892 – IndiaHaplocosmia Schmidt & von Wirth, 1996 – NepalHarpactira Ausserer, 1871 – South Africa, NamibiaHarpactirella Purcell, 1902 – South Africa, MoroccoHemirrhagus Simon, 1903 – MexicoHeterophrictus Pocock, 1900 – IndiaHeteroscodra Pocock, 1900 – Cameroon, Gabon, CongoHeterothele Karsch, 1879 – Africa, ArgentinaHolothele Karsch, 1879 – Caribbean, South AmericaHomoeomma Ausserer, 1871 – South AmericaHysterocrates Simon, 1892 – AfricaIdiothele Hewitt, 1919 – South AfricaIridopelma Pocock, 1901 – BrazilIschnocolus Ausserer, 1871 – Africa, Asia, Brazil, EuropeKankuamo Perafán, Galvis & Pérez-Miles, 2016Kochiana Fukushima, Nagahama & Bertani, 2008 – BrazilLampropelma Simon, 1892 – Indonesia, Malaysia, SingaporeLasiodora C. L. Koch, 1850 – South America, Costa RicaLasiodorides Schmidt & Bischoff, 1997 – Ecuador, PeruLongilyra Gabriel, 2014 – El SalvadorLoxomphalia Simon, 1889 – TanzaniaLoxoptygus Simon, 1903 – EthiopiaLyrognathus Pocock, 1895 – Indonesia, India, MalaysiaMagnacarina Mendoza, Locht, Kaderka, Medina & Pérez-Miles, 2016 – MexicoMascaraneus Gallon, 2005 – MauritiusMegaphobema Pocock, 1901 – Costa Rica, Colombia, EcuadorMelognathus Chamberlin, 1917Metriopelma Becker, 1878 – MexicoMiaschistopus Pocock, 1897 – VenezuelaMonocentropus Pocock, 1897 – Yemen, MadagascarMunduruku Miglio, Bonaldo & Pérez-Miles, 2013Murphyarachne Sherwood & Gabriel, 2022 - PeruMygalarachne Ausserer, 1871 – HondurasMyostola Simon, 1903 – Gabon, CameroonNeischnocolus Petrunkevitch, 1925 – PanamaNeoheterophrictus Siliwal & Raven, 2012 – IndiaNeoholothele Guadanucci & Weinmann, 2015 – Colombia, Trinidad and Tobago, VenezuelaNeostenotarsus Pribik & Weinmann, 2004 – French GuianaNesiergus Simon, 1903 – SeychellesNesipelma Schmidt & Kovařík, 1996 – St. Kitts and NevisNhandu Lucas, 1983 – Brazil, ParaguayOmothymus Thorell, 1891 – MalaysiaOrnithoctonus Pocock, 1892 – Myanmar, ThailandOrphnaecus Simon, 1892 – Papua New Guinea, PhilippinesOzopactus Simon, 1889 – VenezuelaPachistopelma Pocock, 1901 – BrazilPamphobeteus Pocock, 1901 – South America, PanamaPelinobius Karsch, 1885 – Kenya, TanzaniaPhlogiellus Pocock, 1897 – Asia, Papua New GuineaPhoneyusa Karsch, 1884 – AfricaPhormictopus Pocock, 1901 – Cuba, Argentina, BrazilPhormingochilus Pocock, 1895 – IndonesiaPhrixotrichus Simon, 1889 – Chile, ArgentinaPlesiopelma Pocock, 1901 – South AmericaPlesiophrictus Pocock, 1899 – India, Micronesia, Sri LankaPoecilotheria Simon, 1885 – Sri Lanka, IndiaProshapalopus Mello-Leitão, 1923 – Brazil, ColombiaPsalistopsSimon, 1889 - Colombia and VenezuelaPsalmopoeus Pocock, 1895 – Trinidad, South America, Central America, MexicoPsednocnemis West, Nunn & Hogg, 2012 – Malaysia, IndonesiaPseudhapalopus Strand, 1907 – South America, TrinidadPseudoclamoris Hüsser, 2018 – Colombia, Peru, EcuadorPseudoschizopelmaSmith, 1995 - MexicoPterinochilus Pocock, 1897 – AfricaPterinopelma Pocock, 1901 – BrazilReichlingia Rudloff, 2001 – BelizeReversopelma Schmidt, 2001 – Ecuador or PeruSahydroaraneus Mirza & Sanap, 2014 – IndiaSandinista Longhorn & Gabriel, 2019Schismatothele Karsch, 1879 – Venezuela, ColombiaSchizopelma F. O. Pickard-Cambridge, 1897 – MexicoScopelobates Simon, 1903 – Dominican RepublicSelenocosmia Ausserer, 1871 – Oceania, AsiaSelenogyrus Pocock, 1897 – Côte d'Ivoire, Sierra LeoneSelenotholus Hogg, 1902 – AustraliaSelenotypus Pocock, 1895 – AustraliaSericopelma Ausserer, 1875 – Central America, Brazil, MexicoSickius Soares & Camargo, 1948 – BrazilSphaerobothria Karsch, 1879 – Costa Rica, PanamaSpinosatibiapalpus Gabriel & Sherwood, 2020Stichoplastoris Rudloff, 1997 – El Salvador, Costa Rica, PanamaStromatopelma Karsch, 1881 – AfricaTaksinus Songsangchote, Sippawat, Khaikaew & Chomphuphuang, 2022 - ThailandTapinauchenius Ausserer, 1871 – South America, Saint Vincent and the GrenadinesTheraphosa Thorell, 1870 – South AmericaThrigmopoeus Pocock, 1899 – IndiaThrixopelma Schmidt, 1994 – Peru, ChileTliltocatl - Mexico, Costa Rica, GuatemalaTmesiphantes Simon, 1892 – BrazilTrichognathella Gallon, 2004 – South AfricaTrichopelma Simon, 1888 – Caribbean, South America, Central AmericaTyphochlaena C. L. Koch, 1850 – BrazilUmbyquyra Gargiulo, Brescovit & Lucas, 2018 – Bolivia, BrazilVitalius Lucas, Silva & Bertani, 1993 – Brazil, ArgentinaXenesthis Simon, 1891 – Panama, Venezuela, ColombiaYanomamius Bertani & Almeida, 2021 – Brazil, VenezuelaYbyrapora Fukushima & Bertani, 2017 – Brazil

Former genera:Ami Pérez-Miles, 2008 → NeischnocolusBarropelma Chamberlin, 1940 → NeischnocolusEurypelmella Strand, 1907, nomen dubiumMagulla Simon, 1892 → TmesiphantesMelloleitaoina Gerschman & Schiapelli, 1960 → Tmesiphantes''

Fossil record 
Although  fossils of mygalomorph spiders date back to the Triassic, only two specimens have been found so far which can be convincingly assigned to the Theraphosidae. One is from Dominican Republic amber; the other is from Chiapas (Mexico) amber. Both these ambers are quite young, being Miocene in age or about 16 million years old.

See also 

 Cultural depictions of spiders
 Guangxitoxin
 Spider bite
 Spider taxonomy

References

Further reading

External links 

 TarantulaForum.com
 
 Tarantulas US Forum
 Word of the Day: Tarantula and Tarantella, etymology and folklore
 Overview of Species Information for All Named Theraphosidae Divided by Subfamily
 Listing of all currently named Theraphosidae
 American Tarantula Society Headquarters
 Amazing Tarantulas
 
 Watch Tarantula (Theraphosidae) video clips from the BBC archive on Wildlife Finder
 Theraphosidae Belgium, everything about bird eaters
 

 
Extant Miocene first appearances